Race relations is a sociological concept that emerged in Chicago in connection with the work of sociologist Robert E. Park and the Chicago race riot of 1919. Race relations designates a paradigm or field in sociology and a legal concept in the United Kingdom. As a sociological field, race relations attempts to explain how racial groups relate to each other, and in particular to give an explanation of violence connected to race.

The paradigm of race relations was critiqued by its own practitioners for its failure to predict the anti-racist struggles of the 1960s. The paradigm has also been criticized as overlooking the power differential between races, implying that the source of violence is disharmony rather than racist power structures. Critics of the term "race relations" have called it a euphemism for white supremacy or racism.

In spite of the controversial or discredited status of the race relations paradigm, the term is sometimes used in a generic way to designate matters related to race. Opinion polls, such as Gallup polls, use the term "race relations" to group together various responses connected to race. University sociology courses are often named "Race and Ethnic Relations."

In the United States
Robert E. Park of the University of Chicago coined the term "race relations cycle," which he believed to be a universal pattern emerging when races come into contact. The cycle was supposed to be driven by subjective attitudes that members of races feel toward other races. Park felt that race relations are hostile at first, but thaw over time.

The steps in Park's cycle were contact, competition, accommodation, and assimilation. Park did not carry out studies across ethnic groups to check that his cycle approximated reality. However, his students tested his ideas by studying communities of Chinese and Japanese origin living in the United States and found that, contrary to Park's theory, adopting white culture did not lead to acceptance by white Americans. Park did not discard his theory in spite of the failures to verify it.

In 1919, white residents of Chicago instigated the mass murder of black residents, an event known as the Chicago race riot of 1919. After this violent event, city authorities established the Chicago Commission on Race Relations. This was composed entirely of men, six African-Americans and six European-Americans.

Sociologist Everett Hughes published a collection of Park's articles in 1950, seven years after Park's death. The beginnings of the Civil Rights Movement in the 1950s caused interest in the study of race, and Park's work became a founding text in the emerging field named "race relations." African-American scholars had little more than token representation in this field.

Because the field of race relations imagined steady progress, it failed to predict the radical upheavals of the Civil Rights Movement in the 1960s. Everett Hughes delivered an address at the American Sociological Association (of which he was president) titled Race Relations and the Sociological Imagination in which Hughes confessed the failure of prediction: "Why did social scientists — and sociologists in particular — not foresee the explosion of collective action of Negro Americans toward immediate full integration into American society?"

The Kerner Report, commissioned by the US government in 1967 to study the causes of 1960s race riots, said that the Watts riots of 1965 "shocked all who had been confident that race relations were improving in the North." The report clarified that the major cause of the riots was white racism, and recommended job creation measures and police reform. President Lyndon B. Johnson discarded the report's recommendations.

In the 1970s, some sociologists sought to replace the notion of race relations with the notion of racial oppression. For example, the 1972 book Racial Oppression in America by Bob Blauner challenged the race relations paradigm.

In the United Kingdom 

The concept of race relations became institutionally significant in the United Kingdom through the establishment of the Department of Social Anthropology under the leadership of Kenneth Little at the University of Edinburgh.

Institutions
The Institute of Race Relations was established in 1958. Its remit was to research, publish and collect resources on race relations across the world. However, in 1972, the membership of the institute supported the staff in the radical transformation of the organisation: rather than being a policy-oriented academic institution  it became an anti-racist think tank.

The Race Relations Board was created following the passing of the Race Relations Act 1965 as a body "to assess and resolve individual cases of discrimination." Its remit was originally restricted to places of public resort and regarding disposal of tenancies, but this was expanded with the passage of the Race Relations Act 1968.

Legislation in the UK
Race Relations Acts are legislation in the United Kingdom to outlaw racial discrimination:
 Race Relations Act 1965
 Race Relations Act 1968
 Race Relations Act 1976

Criticism
The concept of race relations has been criticized as implying an evenly-matched relationship between races, rather than an unequal oppression. For example, Stephen Steinberg of CUNY says that the term "racial oppression" should be used instead:While the term "race relations" is meant to convey value neutrality, on closer examination it is riddled with value. Indeed, its rhetorical function is to obfuscate the true natue of "race relations," which is a system of racial domination and exploitation based on violence, resulting in the suppression and dehumanization of an entire people over centuries of American history.

Journalist Charles M. Blow observes that Americans who were polled on their "satisfaction with race relations" reported lower satisfaction after the rise of Black Lives Matter, an anti-racism movement. The term "race relations," according to Blow, "suggests a relationship that swings from harmony to disharmony." Objecting to racism creates awareness of disharmony, whereas silently submitting to racial oppression creates a false impression of harmonious race relations. Because of this counterintuitive result, Blow contends that the terms "race relations," "racial tension," and "racial division" are unhelpful euphemisms for what should properly be called white supremacy.

Reconciliation

Reconciliation is a term used in truth and reconciliation commissions around the world, and used in various countries when referring to improving relations between their First Nations peoples and the rest of the population. Reconciliation in Australia has been part of Australian Government policy since 1991, and the term is also used in New Zealand, Canada, the United States (as in the Maine Wabanaki-State Truth and Reconciliation Commission), and in Europe.

See also 
 Sociology of race and ethnic relations

References

Further reading
 
 

Anthropology
Law of the United Kingdom
Race relations in the United Kingdom
Sociological theories
Multiracial affairs
Majority–minority relations